Quảng Khê may refer to several places in Vietnam:

Quảng Khê, Bắc Kạn, a rural commune of Ba Bể District
Quảng Khê, Đắk Nông, a rural commune of Đắk Glong District
, a rural commune of Quảng Xương District.